The tun is an English unit of liquid volume (not weight), used for measuring wine, oil or honey. Typically a large vat or vessel, most often holding 252 wine gallons, but occasionally other sizes (e.g. 256, 240 and 208 gallons) were also used. The modern tun is about 954 litres.

History
Originally, the tun was defined as 256 wine gallons; this is the basis for the name of the quarter of 64 corn gallons. At some time before the 15th century, it was reduced to 252 wine gallons, so as to be evenly divisible by other small integers, including seven.

In one Early Modern English example from 1507, a tun is defined as 240 gallons.

With the adoption of the Queen Anne wine gallon of 231 cubic inches in 1706 the tun approximated the volume of a cylinder with both diameter and height of 42 inches. These were adopted as the standard US liquid gallon and tun.

When the imperial system was introduced in 1824 the tun was redefined in the UK and colonies as 210 imperial gallons. The imperial tun remained evenly divisible by small integers. There was also little change in the actual value of the tun.

Standard tuns of wine came to serve as a measure of a ship's capacity.

Definitions 
In the US customary system, the tun (symbol: US tu) is defined as 252 US fluid gallons (about ).

In the imperial system, the tun is defined as 210 imperial gallons (about ).

Conversions 

Both the imperial and US tuns were subdivided into smaller units as follows.

Explanatory notes

See also
 Tonelada

References 

Customary units of measurement
Units of volume